Nenad Savić (Serbian Cyrillic: Ненад Савић; born 28 January 1981 in SFR Yugoslavia) is a Serbian-born Swiss footballer.

After four season with FC Basel, he joined FC Lucerne in summer 2003, but moved to FC Wil in January 2004, and moved again in January 2005 to FC Thun. Savić later signed a one-year contract with Hapoel Ironi Kiryat Shmona in July 2009.

On 1 March 2012, Savić was convicted of dealing cocaine by a district court in Zurich and given a three-year sentence.

Honours
 Swiss Super League (1):
 2001–02
 Swiss Cup (2):
 2002, 2003
Toto Cup (Leumit) (1):
 2009

References

1981 births
Living people
Place of birth missing (living people)
Serbian emigrants to Switzerland
Swiss men's footballers
FC Thun players
FC Luzern players
FC Basel players
Grasshopper Club Zürich players
Neuchâtel Xamax FCS players
FC Wil players
FC Zürich players
Maccabi Petah Tikva F.C. players
Maccabi Ironi Jatt F.C. players
Hapoel Ironi Kiryat Shmona F.C. players
Beitar Tel Aviv Bat Yam F.C. players
Swiss Super League players
Israeli Premier League players
Liga Leumit players
Expatriate footballers in Israel
Serbian expatriate sportspeople in Israel
Association football midfielders